Euro-orphan or EU orphan is a neologism used metaphorically to describe a "social orphan" in the European Union whose parents have migrated to another member state, typically for economic reasons. The child is left behind, often in the care of older relatives. The expression itself is a misnomer, since it is meant to describe temporary child abandonment, rather than the death of both parents. A similar name is White Orphans.

Such abandoned children may require therapeutic or psychiatric care to cope. The EU supports family reunification. Migrating families are sometimes divided by local child services  (Jugendamt). The number of Euro-orphans in the EU is estimated to be between 0.5-1 million, more Euro-orphans live outside the EU, e.g. in Ukraine.

Łukasz Krzyżanowski has coined a similar term, "old euro-orphans", describing elderly parents left behind by migrants.

Media
"Euroorphans – the children left behind" - documentary by Sven Bergman
"I am Kuba" - documentary by Åse Svenheim Drivenes

Books
Anne White, Polish Families and Migration Since EU Accession, 2017

See also
Abandoned child syndrome
Child displacement
Dead mother complex
Maternal deprivation
Migrations from Poland since EU accession
Parental alienation
Separation anxiety
Social orphan
Transnational child protection
Unaccompanied minor
List of European Union member states by average wage
Left-behind children in China

References

External links
As Poland loses its doctors and builders, ‘Euro-orphans’ are left at home to suffer
The plight of Europe's 'euro orphans'
“I am Kuba” – Portray of Polish Euro-Orphan At Thessaloniki Documentary Festival
Deformed family communication  in case of euro-orphan families (Latvia)

Child abandonment
Child development
Child welfare
Childhood in Europe
Internal migrations in Europe
European Union society
Living arrangements
Metaphors
Neologisms
Parenting
Social issues in Europe